The Women's Basketball League (WBL) is the highest level of women's basketball in the Netherlands. The first season was played in 1949. Blue Stars is the record titleholder of the league with 20 championships. As of 2021, the league consists of nine teams.

History
From its establishment, the league was known as "Eredivisie".

In 2019, the league name was changed from Vrouwen Basketball League (VBL) to Women's Basketball League (WBL). The 2019–20 season was cancelled prematurely because of the COVID-19 pandemic, the first time the competition was not played out. No champion was named.

2021–22 clubs

The league currently consists of 9 teams. In the 2022–23 season, BAL will enter the league as its tenth team.

Note: Table lists in alphabetical order.

List of champions

1950 Westerkwartier Amsterdam
1951 Blue Stars
1952 Blue Stars
1953 Blue Stars
1954 Blue Stars
1955 Blue Stars
1956 Blue Stars
1957 Blue Stars
1958 Blue Stars
1959 Blue Stars
1960 Landlust
1961 AMVJ Amsterdam
1962 Blue Stars
1963 Blue Stars
1964 Blue Stars
1965 AMVJ Amsterdam
1966 Blue Stars
1967 AMVJ Amsterdam
1968 AMVJ Amsterdam
1969 Blue Stars
1970 AMVJ Amsterdam
1971 Blue Stars
1972 Blue Stars
1973 Blue Stars
1974 Blue Stars
1975 Blue Stars
1976 Blue Stars
1977 RZ
1978 RZ
1979 BOB Oud-Beijerland
1980 Landlust
1981 Landlust
1982 BV Amstelveen 
1983 BV Amstelveen
1984 BV Amstelveen
1985 Den Helder
1986 Canadians
1987 Hoofddorp
1988 Den Helder
1989 Den Helder
1990 Den Helder 
1991 Den Helder
1992 Voorburg
1993 Tonego
1994 Tonego
1995 Tonego
1996 Den Helder
1997 Lieshout
1998 Den Helder
1999 Den Helder 
2000 Den Helder 
2001 Landslake Lions 
2002 Jolly Jumpers 
2003 Lely 
2004 Den Helder
2005 Den Helder 
2006 Den Helder
2007 Landslake Lions
2008 Den Helder 
2009 Den Helder
2010 Landslake Lions
2011 Leiderdorp
2012 Landslake Lions
2013 Landslake Lions
2014 Binnenland
2015 Batouwe
2016 Landslake Lions
2017 Batouwe
2018 Grasshoppers
2019 Grasshoppers
2020 None
2021 Den Helder
2022 Den Helder

Performance by team
Teams in bold are still active in the VBL.

References

External links
Profile at eurobasket.com
 http://www.vrouwen-basketball.nl/

Netherlands
Basketball in the Netherlands
Sports leagues established in 1949
Professional sports leagues in the Netherlands